Teodoro Locsin may refer to:

Teodoro Locsin Sr. (1914–2000), journalist, publisher of The Philippines Free Press Magazine, and father of current Philippine Secretary of Foreign Affairs Teodoro Locsin Jr.
Teodoro Locsin Jr. (born 1948), Filipino politician, diplomat, lawyer, and current Philippine Secretary of Foreign Affairs

Locsin, Teodoro